Cuyo Spanish or Cuyano Spanish (Español Cuyano) is the dialect of Spanish that evolved in the historical province of Cuyo and that is now spoken in the Argentine provinces of Mendoza and San Juan. To a lesser extent it is also spoken in the provinces of San Luis and La Rioja. Cuyo Spanish shares a series of common traits with Chilean Spanish due to settlement history and commercial ties. Later on, under the Argentine Republic Rioplatense Spanish, the dialect of Buenos Aires and Uruguay influenced Cuyo Spanish.   

Spanish dialects of South America
Languages of Argentina
Spanish Argentine